Torgil Øwre Gjertsen (born 12 March 1992) is a Norwegian football player currently playing as a striker for Eliteserien club Kristiansund.

Career statistics

References

1992 births
Living people
Footballers from Trondheim
Norwegian footballers
Ranheim Fotball players
Norwegian First Division players
Kristiansund BK players
Wisła Płock players
Eliteserien players
Ekstraklasa players
Expatriate footballers in Poland

Association football forwards